Mount Sill is one of the fourteeners of the Sierra Nevada in California.  It is located in the Palisades, a group of prominent rock peaks with a few small glaciers on their flanks.  Mount Sill is located 0.6 miles (1 km) east of North Palisade, the high point of the group. The two peaks are connected by a high, rocky ridge, on the north side of which lies the Palisade Glacier.  Mount Sill lies on the main Sierra Crest, but is at a point where the crest turns sharply, giving it particularly striking summit views. On one side is Kings Canyon National Park and Fresno County; on the other is the John Muir Wilderness, Inyo National Forest and Inyo County.

Routes on Mount Sill are found on all sides of the peak and range in difficulty from scrambles to a moderately technical rock climbs (class 5.7).

The mountain is called Nen-i-mish ("the Guardian of the Valley") by the indigenous Northern Paiute people. Its English name was coined, in 1904, by Joseph LeConte, a noted mountaineer, in honor of American poet Edward Rowland Sill.

See also
 List of California fourteeners
 The Palisades of the Sierra Nevada
 Mount Gayley

References

External links
 

Fourteeners of California
Mountains of Kings Canyon National Park
Mountains of the John Muir Wilderness
Mountains of Inyo County, California
Mountains of Fresno County, California
Mountains of Northern California
North American 4000 m summits
Religious places of the indigenous peoples of North America